North Street, currently known as the Impact Arena for sponsorship purposes, is a football stadium in Alfreton, Derbyshire, England. It is the home of Alfreton Town who currently play in the National League North. The stadium has a capacity is 3,600, of which 1,500 is seated.

Between 1986 and 1988, the stadium was home to a rugby league team called Mansfield Marksman. It has two seated stands and one standing stand.  The fourth side contains a bar and the changing rooms. Alfreton recently unveiled plans to move to a new all-seater stadium in the near future, but that would depend on Alfreton's return to, and success in, the Conference National.

The Central Midlands League Cup Final takes place at North Stadium, and has done so since 2000–01.

References

External links
 North Street at the Football Ground Guide

Alfreton Town F.C.
Football venues in England
Football venues in Derbyshire
Defunct rugby league venues in England
Amber Valley
Sports venues completed in 1959